"Juro Que"  is a song performed by Spanish singer and songwriter Rosalía. It was released through Columbia Records on January 23, 2020. The song talks about the imprisonment of a lover. "Juro Que" brings Rosalía back to her flamenco fusion days thanks to the presence of a Spanish guitar, aggressive guitar chords and minimal production. It was performed in a shortened version at the 62nd Grammy Awards.

Background
On January 22, 2020, Rosalía posted a picture with Spanish Élite star Omar Ayuso on her respective social media profiles with the caption "Juro que". The day after, the singer posted a video of her listening to the song on her Instagram Stories. A couple hours after it, she announced that the song would be released on streaming platforms that same day. An hour before the official release, "Juro Que" leaked on Shazam and Apple Music.

Critical reception
Writing for Los 40, Laura Coca made the following statement about the song: "the Spanish guitar and palmas share protagonism with the imposing voice of Rosalía. There's a lot of sentiment in every note. Embracing old melodies similar to the ones used in 'Que No Salga la Luna' and 'Di Mi Nombre', I am sure that this new single of her will become another chart-topper single".

Music video 
The music video for "Juro Que" was uploaded to YouTube on January 23, 2020. It stars Rosalía and actor Omar Ayuso. Rosalía plays the role of a woman whose lover has been imprisoned for over four hundred days. She promises loyalty to him and that she'll do whatever is in her hands to free him. The whole video consists of both of them interacting during a tête-à-tête. The video was directed by Tanu Muino and produced by Montse Urniza. It was filmed in Barcelona in fall 2019.

It received over 5 million views on YouTube in 24 hours.

Connection with El mal querer 
The song as well as its music video could be related to the singer's 2018 project El mal querer. The album illustrates and tells the story of Flamenca, the main character of the Romance of Flamenca, a 13th-century Occitan novel. In the novel, Flamenca marries her all-time lover. Her husband is very jealous of her and is afraid that another man gets interested in his wife. His worst dreams come true since Flamenca begins a relationship with another man because she feels imprisoned and cautive in her relationship with her husband. When the husband finds it out, he locks her up in a tower for the rest of her life. In the end, Flamenca gets liberated and kills her husband. When the police asks for the responsible, Flamenca's lover turns himself in and accepts the charges even though he isn't the guilty. El mal querer was released on November 2, 2018. It has been 447 days since its release. This connects with the first lyric of the song which says: "my man has been imprisoned for more than 400 days". Thus, this song could be a follow to her 2018 project; a song that continues Flamenca's story.

Personnel
Credits adapted from Tidal

 Rosalía Vila – vocals, songwriting, production, arrangement
 Pablo Díaz-Reixa – production, arrangement, recording engineering
 Daniel Gómez – songwriting
 José David Acedo Morales – arrangement
 DJ Riggins – assistant engineering
 Jacob Richards – assistant engineering
 Mike Seaberg – assistant engineering
 Chris Athens – master engineering
 Jaycen Joshua – mixing engineering
 Morning Estrada – recording engineering

 Ane Jesús Carrasco Molina – choir vocal, clapping
 Anna Colom – choir vocal
 Claudia Gómez – choir vocal
 Jose Alvaro Ibañez – choir vocal, clapping
 José Manuel Fernandez (Tobalo) – choir vocal, clapping
 Juan Carlos Gil – choir vocal, clapping
 Macario Ibañez – choir vocal, clapping
 Miguel Tellez – choir vocal, clapping
 Joselito Acedo – guitar

Charts

Release history

References

2020 singles
2020 songs
Rosalía songs
Song recordings produced by el Guincho
Songs written by Rosalía
Songs written by el Guincho
Spanish-language songs
Music videos directed by Tanu Muino
Music videos shot in Spain